Arkari is a town located in lower Chitral District in the Khyber Pakhtunkhwa province of Pakistan.
It has an average elevation of 1218meters.

See also 

 Gahirat
 Chitral District

References

External links

Khyber-Pakhtunkhwa Government website section on Lower Dir
United Nations

Chitral District
Tehsils of Chitral District
Union councils of Khyber Pakhtunkhwa
Populated places in Chitral District
Union councils of Chitral District